No. 610 (County of Chester) Squadron of the Royal Air Force was a Squadron of the Auxiliary Air Force. Comprising very high quality pilots, often ex-RAF officers and occasionally locally based company Test pilots from companies such as de Havilland and Airwork, its pilots were initially part timers who would spend their weekends and spare time flying and practising combat manoeuvres. The squadron was named the "County of Chester" and adopted the motto "Alifero tollitur axe ceres"; which translates as "Ceres rising in a winged chariot", Ceres being the Roman Goddess of Wheat, a reference to Chester's Agricultural sector. Its badge contained the image of a garb (sheaf of wheat).

610 Squadron Association, with headquarters at Hooton Park, has a substantial number of ex-members of the Squadron on its list of members.

History

Formation and early years
The squadron was formed on 10 February 1936 at Hooton Park, Wirral, Cheshire as one of the Auxiliary Air Force Squadrons.  It was equipped with Hawker Hart light bombers. As war approached, these were replaced by Hawker Hinds in May 1938. On 1 January 1939 the squadron role was changed to that of a fighter squadron, and on the outbreak of war in September 1939 it received its first Hawker Hurricane fighters. By the end of that same month it was flying the more advanced Supermarine Spitfire fighter.

Second World War 

610 Squadron was attached to No. 13 Group RAF during the Battle of Britain. It had initially been based at RAF Gravesend, but moved to RAF Biggin Hill before the German offensive began and was one of the units bearing the brunt of German attacks. It moved to RAF Acklington for rest and recuperation at the end of August, having sustained severe casualties. During the Battle of Britain the squadron included Pilot Officer, later Squadron Leader, Constantine Pegge.

In 1941, the squadron moved south to RAF Westhampnett where it was one of Douglas Bader's three Spitfire squadrons of the Tangmere wing. It remained based in the UK until late 1944 when it moved to the Continent to provide fighter cover as the allies entered Germany. 610 Squadron was disbanded before the end of the war at RAF Warmwell on 3 March 1945.

Post-war

The squadron was re-formed on 10 May 1946 at RAF Hooton Park as a Royal Auxiliary Air Force fighter squadron, embodied in June of that year and receiving its first Spitfire F.14s in November 1946, switching to more powerful Spitfire F.22s in March 1949. Gloster Meteor F.4 jet fighters were received in July 1951, being replaced by the later F.8 version in March 1952. Meteor T.7 twin-seat training aircraft were also used as advanced conversion trainers. The Meteors were flown until shortly before the squadron disbanded on 10 March 1957, together with all other RAuxAF flying units.

See also
List of Royal Air Force aircraft squadrons

Aircraft operated

Squadron bases

Commanding officers

References

Notes

Bibliography

External links

 squadron memories
 Official squadron history

Fighter squadrons of the Royal Air Force in World War II
610 Squadron
Military units and formations established in 1936
Military units and formations disestablished in 1957
RAF squadrons involved in the Battle of Britain